Peanuts 500  may refer to several amusement rides located at the Planet Snoopy themed area of Cedar Fair Parks:

 PEANUTS 500 at Canada's Wonderland
 PEANUTS 500 at Cedar Point
 PEANUTS 500 at Dorney Park & Wildwater Kingdom
 Peanuts 500 (Kings Island)
 PEANUTS 500 at Valleyfair
 PEANUTS 500 at Worlds of Fun